Fritz Kuchen (10 September 1877 – 26 May 1973) was a Swiss sport shooter who competed in the 1920 Summer Olympics.

In 1920 he won a bronze medal in the 300 metre military rifle, prone event as well as two bronze medals as member of the Swiss team in the team free rifle competition and in the team 300 and 600 metre military rifle, prone competition. In the 1920 Summer Olympics he also participated in the following events:

 Team 300 metre military rifle, prone - fourth place
 Team 600 metre military rifle, prone - sixth place
 Team 300 metre military rifle, standing - eighth place
 300 metre free rifle, three positions - place unknown

References

1877 births
1973 deaths
Swiss male sport shooters
ISSF pistol shooters
ISSF rifle shooters
Olympic shooters of Switzerland
Shooters at the 1920 Summer Olympics
Olympic bronze medalists for Switzerland
Olympic medalists in shooting
Medalists at the 1920 Summer Olympics